Sinković is a Croatian surname.

It is the third most common surname in the Krapina-Zagorje County of Croatia.

It may refer to:

 Martin Sinković, Croatian rower
 Valent Sinković, Croatian rower

See also
 Sinkovitz

References

Croatian surnames